Arthur Bartman (26 March 1972 – 19 March 2019) was a South African football goalkeeper who last played for Kaizer Chiefs in the South African Premier Division.

Biography 
Arthur Bartman was a retired footballer from South Africa and a goalkeeper coach at Maritzburg United. He was born in 1972 in Pietermaritzburg and during his playing career he featured for such clubs as Bay United, Moroka Swallows, SuperSport United, Bush Bucks, African Wanderers and Kaizer Chiefs. He joined Kaizer Chiefs in 2009 and had been the first-choice keeper.

In 2014, Bartman retired from playing and opted for coaching work at Maritzburg United.

Personal life and death 
Bartman died from meningitis on 19 March 2019, at the age of 46.

Honours 
Kaizer Chiefs

 Telkom Knockout: 2010
 MTN 8 runner-up: 2011

References

South African soccer players
Association football goalkeepers
Kaizer Chiefs F.C. players
Moroka Swallows F.C. players
Free State Stars F.C. players
Sportspeople from Pietermaritzburg
SuperSport United F.C. players
Bush Bucks F.C. players
1972 births
2019 deaths
Cape Coloureds
Bay United F.C. players
Deaths from meningitis